Sir Richard Thomas Dyke Acland, 15th Baronet (26 November 1906 – 24 November 1990) was one of the founding members of the British Common Wealth Party in 1942, having previously been a Liberal Member of Parliament (MP). He joined the Labour Party in 1945 and was later a Labour MP. He was one of the founders of the Campaign for Nuclear Disarmament (CND).

First years
Richard Thomas Dyke Acland was born on 26 November 1906 at Broadclyst, Devon, the eldest son of Sir Francis Dyke Acland (1874-1939), 14th Baronet, a Liberal Member of Parliament (MP) and his first wife Eleanor Acland, née Cropper (1878-1933), a Liberal politician, suffragist, and novelist. He had two brothers and one sister, and his brother Geoffrey Acland, was also a Liberal politician.

He was educated at Rugby School and Balliol College, Oxford, before qualifying as a barrister (admitted at the Inner Temple in 1930). He briefly served in peacetime as a lieutenant in the 96th (Royal Devon Yeomanry) Field Brigade, RA.

Acland stood unsuccessfully for Parliament as potential MP for Torquay at the 1929 general election. He was elected Liberal MP for Barnstaple at the 1935 election, having first contested the seat in the 1931 general election. He was a junior whip for the Liberals. He helped launch the Popular Front in December 1936. His politics changed course subsequently, as seen in the various political pamphlets he wrote.

On 15 April 1936, he married Anne Stella Alford, an architect, and together they had four sons, including John Dyke Acland and Robert D. Acland.

He succeeded his father as baronet in 1939.

Common Wealth Party
In 1942, Acland broke from the Liberals to found the socialist Common Wealth Party with J. B. Priestley and Tom Wintringham, opposing the coalition between the major parties. During the Second World War, the new party showed signs of a breakthrough, especially in London and Merseyside, winning three by-elections.  However, the 1945 general election was a severe disappointment. Only one Member of Parliament, Ernest Millington, was elected, and other figures left, some joining the Labour Party. Acland himself failed to win Putney, where he came third.

Labour MP
Acland joined Labour and was selected to fight the Gravesend seat following the expulsion of the Labour member of parliament Garry Allighan from the party for making allegations of corruption.  He won the Gravesend by-election of November 1947 with a majority of 1,675.

Back in Parliament, Acland served as Second Church Estates Commissioner 1950–51. In 1955, he resigned from Labour in protest against the party's support for the Conservative government's nuclear defence policy, and lost Gravesend standing as an independent the same year, allowing the Conservatives to take the seat, denying it to the new Labour candidate, Victor Mishcon.

Later career

As an advocate of public land ownership, Acland felt it impossible to reconcile his possession of the Acland estates with his politics; in 1944 he sold his West Country estates at Killerton in Devon and Holnicote in Somerset to the National Trust for £134,000 (2011 equivalent £13.5 million), partly out of principle and also to ensure their preservation intact. 

This decision to relinquish the Acland property led to disagreements with his wife and the possibility of separation, but they eventually reconciled; Anne Acland, before depositing her letters, destroyed all those relating to this period of disagreement, between mid-summer 1942 and January 1943.
Corresponding with the National Trust, Acland said: "I am not giving you all my property. I am keeping some of it to live on, some of it to buy a house, and some of it I am giving to Common Wealth. With what is left I pay off as much of the debts as possible [these being £21,000 death duties on his father's estate, and £11,000 accumulated debt, equivalent to circa £3 million in 2011], and then hand over the rest to you, leaving you, I regret to say, to look after what is left of the debts."

The terms of this deal were kept secret; "in widespread publicity from which the National Trust and the Aclands emerged glowing with virtue, the entire transaction was portrayed as a gift" and "the Aclands held on to... eighteenth-century family plates and dishes, portraits and landscapes, a group of family miniatures, an early nineteenth-century piano... they were able to buy a nice house in Hampstead at 66 Frognal Street; there was to be an education fund for the boys; and Common Wealth received about £65,000, allowing it to win two more by-elections." 

Additionally, Acland retained some feudal rights, including the gift of the living at the parish church, and entitlement to shooting ("to be arranged as to suit the convenience of the shooting tenants") and fishing (with one rod on the Nutscale Reservoir).

Acland's sons were in later years displeased with the sale of the estates; the heir, John, left a 1994 document at Devon Record Office outlining "how he had made many requests that his mother 'should explain to me why the Killerton and Holnicote estates had been given (sic) to the National Trust in the 1940s'... John found on reading [the letters between his mother and father] that she had destroyed all the documents from the critical period at the end of 1942... His note continued: 'Anne only talked to me once, in 1989, about the gift (sic) of the estates... her principal contention was that she and Richard had been in complete agreement at every stage.' Perhaps all this secrecy, the denial of the story, was an attempt by Anne and Richard to protect themselves from the rage of their children."

Soon after leaving parliament he took a job as a maths master at Wandsworth Grammar School in Sutherland Grove, new Southfields, London, with effect from September 1955. In 1957 he helped to form the Campaign for Nuclear Disarmament (CND), and was a senior lecturer in education at St. Luke's College of Education, Exeter, between 1959 and his retirement in 1974. He became president of The Devonshire Association in 1974. Acland died in Exeter in 1990, two days before his 84th birthday.

Writings
Acland's book, Unser Kampf, published by Penguin in 1940, containing ideas inspired by a Christian-based moral view of society. It proved immensely popular, going through 5 impressions in six months. His later works, The Forward March (1941) and How it can be done (1943) elaborated on these themes. He advocated common ownership, citing the work of Conrad Noel as well as the Bible to support his views.

Key publications
Unser Kampf (Our Struggle), Penguin Books, 1940
The Forward March, Allen & Unwin, 1941
What It Will Be Like in the New Britain, Victor Gollancz, 1942
How It Can Be Done, MacDonald, 1943

References

Bibliography

 The Acland Papers at the University of Exeter
 Becher, P., Becker, K. (2022). Antifaschismus, Demokratie und Gemeineigentum in Großbritannien. Richard Acland und die Vor- und Nachgeschichte des 'Spirit of '45''', in Arbeit - Bewegung - Geschichte, volume xxi, no. 2, pp. 95-116.
 Stenton, M., Lees, S. (1981). Who's Who of British Members of Parliament, volume iv (covering 1945–1979). Sussex: The Harvester Press; New Jersey: Humanities Press. 
 Neil Stockley, Richard Acland in Brack & Randall (eds.) Dictionary of Liberal Thought'', Politico's 2007, pp3–5

External links
 
 
 

1906 births
1990 deaths
Military personnel from Devon
Royal Artillery officers
Richard Thomas Dyke 1906
People from East Devon District
People educated at Rugby School
Alumni of Balliol College, Oxford
Academics of the University of Exeter
Labour Party (UK) MPs for English constituencies
Common Wealth Party MPs
Liberal Party (UK) MPs for English constituencies
Baronets in the Baronetage of England
English Anglicans
UK MPs 1935–1945
UK MPs 1945–1950
UK MPs 1950–1951
UK MPs 1951–1955
Campaign for Nuclear Disarmament activists
Royal Devon Yeomanry officers
Church Estates Commissioners
Members of the Parliament of the United Kingdom for Barnstaple
Members of the Inner Temple
Common Wealth Party